WNYT (channel 13) is a television station licensed to Albany, New York, United States, serving the Capital District as an affiliate of NBC. It is owned by Hubbard Broadcasting alongside Pittsfield, Massachusetts–licensed MyNetworkTV affiliate WNYA (channel 51). Both stations share studios on North Pearl Street in Menands (with an Albany postal address), while WNYT's transmitter is located on the Helderberg Escarpment west of New Salem.

History

The station began broadcasting on February 17, 1954, as CBS affiliate WTRI, licensed to Troy and broadcasting on UHF channel 35. The station was co-owned by Van Curler Broadcasting, a unit of the Stanley Warner Theaters chain, and Troy Broadcasting Company, owner of WTRY radio (AM 980, now WOFX). Van Curler operated the station. Its studio was located alongside its transmitter on Bald Mountain in the town of Brunswick, east of Troy. The station lost its CBS affiliation to Albany's WROW-TV (channel 41, now WTEN on channel 10) in January 1955. Logically, it should have taken over WROW-TV's ABC affiliation. However, ABC balked, forcing WTRI off the air. Van Curler purchased Troy Broadcasting's stake in WTRI and returned the station to the air in 1956 as an ABC affiliate.

In 1958, Van Curler sought Federal Communications Commission (FCC) permission to move the license to Albany, on channel 13. By this time, the market had expanded to cover not only east-central New York, but also large swaths of southwestern Vermont and western Massachusetts. Not only is this market one of the largest east of the Mississippi River, but much of it is very mountainous. UHF stations have never covered large areas or rugged terrain very well. Van Curler thus jumped at a chance to move to the stronger VHF band. The FCC granted the request, and in December, the station took new call letters, WAST (for Albany, Schenectady, and Troy). Originally, the station had wanted to take the call sign WTAS (for Troy, Albany, and Schenectady) but the similarity of the letters TAS to the news agency of the Soviet Union (known as TASS) led to the use of WAST. As part of a dial realignment, WKTV in Utica moved from channel 13 to channel 2.

Shortly after the upgrade, WAST moved to a converted warehouse on the Albany–Menands line on North Pearl Street, which previously housed Selective Service records. Channel 13 still operates from this location today.

Despite the increased transmitter power, WAST's signal was still significantly weaker in some portions of the Capital District market than its competitors, particularly in the southern portion. This was because as a condition of being allowed to move to the VHF band, it remained on its original transmitter on Bald Mountain (a legacy of the days when it was licensed to Troy) and used a somewhat directional signal to protect WNTA-TV (now WNET) in Newark, near New York City. The other stations in the market had their transmitters on the Helderberg Escarpment. This forced WAST to build several translators to expand its coverage. Combined with the fact it was affiliated with ABC, the smallest and weakest of the three major networks at the time (but, during the late 1970s, ABC's fortunes would improve considerably), channel 13 was not really on par with rivals–WTEN and then-General Electric-owned NBC affiliate WRGB (channel 6)–until cable television arrived in the Capital District in the early 1970s. In 1968 Van Curler sold WAST to Sonderling Broadcasting, a radio company based in the Chicago suburb of Oak Park, Illinois.

On October 23, 1977, the station switched affiliations with WTEN and became the Capital District's CBS affiliate, returning the station to its original affiliation after 22 years. In 1978, the original iteration of Viacom announced its purchase of Sonderling Broadcasting's holdings and made WAST the company's second television station (after WVIT in New Britain, Connecticut) when the sale was finalized two years later, in March 1980. On September 28, 1981, WAST swapped affiliations again, this time with WRGB and became the area's NBC affiliate. Seeking a fresh start and a new identity, Viacom decided to mark the affiliation change with the current call sign of WNYT. It is one of the few stations in the United States to have been a primary affiliate of all of the big three networks.

Viacom's 1994 acquisition of Paramount Pictures placed the company's existing television stations (WNYT; WVIT; WHEC-TV in Rochester; KMOV in St. Louis; and KSLA-TV in Shreveport, Louisiana) under common ownership with Paramount's broadcasting arm, the Paramount Stations Group; the two groups were formally consolidated in December 1995. Prior to the merger, Paramount announced the formation of the United Paramount Network (UPN), which started operating in January 1995; as early as 1994, Viacom was considering selling off its non-UPN stations. In June 1996, Viacom/Paramount agreed to trade WNYT and WHEC-TV to Hubbard Broadcasting in return for UPN affiliate WTOG in St. Petersburg, Florida.

WNYT signed-on its digital signal in October 2003 on VHF channel 12. Unlike the station's analog signal, WNYT's digital transmitter was located in the Helderberg tower farm with the market's other stations.

On February 25, 2013, Hubbard announced that it would purchase WNYA from Venture Technologies to form a duopoly with WNYT, for $2.3 million, pending FCC approval. Hubbard sought a failed station waiver to acquire the station; Venture had put WNYA up for sale in 2009, but no other potential buyers came forward. The sale did not include Class A repeater WNYA-CA which will remain with Venture Technologies. Under a clause of the sale of WNYA that required WNYA-CA to use a new call sign that does not feature the letters "N" or "Y," that station became WEPT-CA on March 8, 2013. On May 29, 2013, the FCC approved the sale of WNYA to Hubbard, with Venture retaining ownership of WEPT-CA.

Programming

Syndicated programming
Syndicated programming on the station includes The Drew Barrymore Show, 25 Words or Less, Rachael Ray, The Kelly Clarkson Show, Inside Edition, and Entertainment Tonight among others.

News operation

For many years, channel 13 ran a distant third in the area's Nielsen ratings behind WRGB and WTEN. This was not only because it was the youngest station in the market, but also because of its signal reception issues. Under Viacom ownership, the station expanded and modernized its studios (newsroom, offices, etc., including the market's first modern computers), becoming a factor in the Capital District ratings race for the first time. The company also made a significant investment in electronic equipment, including a satellite receiving news truck. Investment in talent increased with the building of its own talent and by acquiring key personalities from other stations in the area. The station also benefited from the switch to NBC, giving its resurgent news operation a powerful lead-in as NBC rose to become the ratings leader for most of the second half of the 1980s.

WNYT overtook WTEN for the runner-up spot by the late-1980s, and in 1992, scored its first late news victory over longtime leader WRGB. Gradually, the station overtook WRGB, which had lost considerable momentum due to the retirement of longtime anchor Ernie Tetrault, in other time slots. In Viacom's last sweeps period owning WNYT, the station won every time slot. It remained the overall market leader under Hubbard ownership until mid-2009 when it lost the late weeknight lead to WRGB in the May 2009 ratings period. In November 2009, WNYT's weekday evening newscasts slipped to third place largely due to the station's decision to terminate many of its popular personalities. Two years after Hubbard bought WNYT, it won the distinction of being the first and only station outside of New York City to win a regional Emmy Award for best newscast in New York State. With the re-branding of the station's newscasts from News 13 to NewsChannel 13 in 1991, WNYT became the first station to use the "Live. Local. Late Breaking." tag line slogan which is now commonplace throughout the country.

In the mid-1990s, the station began an alliance with PBS member station WMHT (channel 17). This led to WNYT producing several programs for the public broadcaster including semi-regular town hall meetings, the weekly call-in show Health LINK (which continues today), and for two years the market's first 10 p.m. newscast on WMHT's then-secondary station WMHQ (now WCWN). This production was canceled due to a lack of support. From 2001 until 2004, WNYT also maintained a joint sales agreement (JSA) with Pax affiliate WYPX-TV (channel 55) that included rebroadcasts of newscasts and other local non-news programming.

In 2001, WNYT opened the Berkshire County Bureau on South Church Street in Downtown Pittsfield to cover the Massachusetts side of the market. At that time, the bureau was the first of a Capital District station. The Berkshire County Bureau began to be staffed only on an occasional basis in 2009, and subsequently closed altogether as a result of the 2008 recession, though the station still covers Berkshire County. WCDC (a dark full-time satellite of rival WTEN), had never established any sort of physical presence in the Berkshires despite being licensed in the region before it shut down in 2017 (specifically, Adams). With the acquisition of WNYA, Hubbard has indicated that it would produce newscasts on WNYA with an increased emphasis on news from Berkshire County. It remains to be seen whether this will include any new physical presence (i.e. a news bureau or a full studio) of WNYA and WNYT in the local area.

A newscast airing on WNYA finally premiered September 16, 2013 and is known on-air as NewsChannel 13 Live at 10 on My 4 Albany. The show airs weeknights for a half hour in a fast-paced format and includes a "Berkshire Moment" segment featuring western Massachusetts headlines powered by The Berkshire Eagle. It competes with the firmly established sixty-minute broadcast seen every night on Fox affiliate WXXA-TV (produced by WTEN) and another thirty-minute news show on WCWN (a weeknight-only production by WRGB).

After forging an alliance with the Glens Falls Post-Star, the Saratoga/North Country Bureau was opened on Broadway/NY 50/US 9 in Downtown Saratoga Springs in early 2004. In December 2005, WNYT began broadcasting NBC Weather Plus on its second digital subchannel with a full launch coming two months later on Time Warner Cable digital channel 556. In the late 2000s, WNYT briefly replaced its weekday noon news with an hour-long broadcast at 11 a.m. entitled Midday. On April 24, 2012, WNYT became the third station in Albany to launch newscasts in high definition. Although three other Hubbard-owned stations have already been broadcasting their local news shows in 16:9 enhanced definition widescreen, WNYT is only the second Hubbard-owned station (after company flagship KSTP-TV in St. Paul, Minnesota) to have made the upgrade to full high definition level. The station operates its own Doppler weather radar, known on-air as "NewsChannel 13 First Warning Live Doppler" at its former analog transmitter site on Bald Mountain.

Notable former on-air staff
Andrew Catalon – Broadcaster for CBS Sports and NBC's Olympics coverage.
 Nancy Cozean – The first lead female weekday anchor in the Albany market, left in 1985 to co-anchor the evening newscast at WTZA in Kingston, New York. Later became the mayor of the City of Poughkeepsie.
Todd Gross – Chief meteorologist, 1980–1983.
Chris Kapostasy (Jansing) – 1981–1998, was an anchor from 1987 to 1998, now correspondent and anchor for NBC and MSNBC.
Kari Lake – anchor, 1998–1999, later at KSAZ-TV in Phoenix.
Miles O'Brien – Weekend anchor, mid-1980s; Later spent 16 years at CNN.
Randy Salerno – Weekend anchor, 1988–1993; later went to WGN-TV and then to WBBM-TV in Chicago; killed in snowmobile accident in 2008.
Norm Sebastian – Former weekend, then weekday morning/noon meteorologist); deceased.
Don Weeks – Weatherman during the late 1960s under the name of "Wally Weather"; was the morning show host at WGY from 1980 until his retirement in December 2010 (deceased).

Technical information

Subchannels
The station's digital signal is multiplexed:

Analog-to-digital conversion
WNYT shut down its analog signal, over VHF channel 13, on June 12, 2009, the official date in which full-power television stations in the United States transitioned from analog to digital broadcasts under federal mandate. The station's digital signal remained on its pre-transition VHF channel 12. Through the use of PSIP, digital television receivers display the station's virtual channel as its former VHF analog channel 13. With the 2019 digital television repack, WNYT remained on its current VHF channel 12.

Translators
WNYT operates five additional repeaters. Until the early 1990s, it maintained a translator in Kingston (in the New York City market). This was first located on channel 63 but moved to channel 36 after the launch of WTZA in 1985. The translators were all built because WNYT's analog signal was not as strong as the other major television stations in the Capital District (see above). All stations have since been converted from analog to digital. The Glens Falls and Troy repeaters are licensed under the WNYT call sign but designated as low-power digital replacement translators.

References

External links
WNYT.com – Official website

NYT (TV)
NBC network affiliates
MeTV affiliates
Hubbard Broadcasting
Television channels and stations established in 1954
1954 establishments in New York (state)
Low-power television stations in the United States
Start TV affiliates
Former Viacom subsidiaries